Reinhold Rainer (born 29 August 1973 in Sterzing) is an Italian luger who has competed since 1994. Competing in four Winter Olympics, he earned his best finish of eighth in the men's singles event both in 1998 and in 2006.

Rainer's best finish at the FIL World Luge Championships in the men's singles event was sixth twice (2004, 2007).

His best overall Luge World Cup finish was third in men's singles in 2006-7.

References
 1998 luge men's singles results
 2002 luge men's singles results
 2006 luge men's singles results
 Coni.it profile for the 2006 Winter Olympics 
 FIL-Luge profile
 FISI profile 
 List of men's singles luge World Cup champions since 1978.

External links
 
 
 

1973 births
Living people
Italian lugers
Italian male lugers
Olympic lugers of Italy
Lugers at the 1998 Winter Olympics
Lugers at the 2002 Winter Olympics
Lugers at the 2006 Winter Olympics
Lugers at the 2010 Winter Olympics
Sportspeople from Sterzing